Abunã is district in Porto Velho, the capital of Rondônia, Brazil. The Abuna River and the Madeira River upstream from their confluence mark the boundary between Brazil and Bolivia, and so Abunã is across the river from the Bolivia.

References 

Populated places in Rondônia
Porto Velho